Masada: Hei, also known as ה or Masada 5, is a 1995 album by American composer and saxophonist John Zorn. It is the fifth album of Masada recordings.

Reception
The Allmusic review by David Freedlander awarded the album 4 stars stating "Hei, the fifth release from John Zorn's Masada Quartet, shows the band at their tightest and most agile".

Track listing
All compositions by John Zorn.
 "Paran" - 5:12
 "Halisah" - 6:27
 "Yoreh" - 6:50
 "Beeroth" - 4:13
 "Hobah" - 11:38
 "Neshamah" - 6:06
 "Lakom" - 3:11 - misspelled as "Lakum" on album sleeve 
 "Makedah" - 8:36
 "Hafla'ah" - 4:55
Recorded at Power Station in New York City on July 16 and 17, 1995

Personnel
Masada
John Zorn – alto saxophone
Dave Douglas – trumpet
Greg Cohen – bass
Joey Baron – drums

References

1995 albums
Masada (band) albums
albums produced by John Zorn
DIW Records albums